Toyoki is a masculine Japanese given name.

Possible writings
Toyoki can be written using different combinations of kanji characters. Here are some examples:

豊紀, "bountiful, chronicle"
豊規, "bountiful, to scheme"
豊喜, "bountiful, rejoice"
豊貴, "bountiful, precious"
豊機, "bountiful, opportunity/machine"
豊基, "bountiful, foundation"
豊輝, "bountiful, sparkle"
豊樹, "bountiful, tree"
豊起, "bountiful, rise/wake up"

The name can also be written in hiragana とよき or katakana トヨキ.

Notable people with the name
, Japanese footballer.
Toyoki Kunitake (國武 豊喜, born 1936), Japanese chemist.
, Japanese speed skater.

Japanese masculine given names